The Cork and Muskerry Light Railway was a  narrow gauge railway in County Cork, Ireland. The first part of the railway opened in 1887 and closed in 1934. A major reason for building the railway was to exploit tourist traffic to Blarney Castle.

Initial route
The railway operated from its own station. the Cork Western Road railway station, in Cork city. The initial lines westwards from Cork to Blarney and Coachford opened in 1887 and 1888 respectively. The railway operated as a roadside tramway, and the locomotives were fitted with cowcatchers.

Throughout the railway's existence, the line was equipped with nine steam locomotives.

The Cork Electric Tramways and Lighting Company was later to share railways' line out of Cork city.

Donoughmore extension
An  extension was built north-westerly from St Annes (on the Blarney branch) to Donoughmore. The line was opened in 1893. It was legally a separate company (the Donoughmore Extension Light Railway Company, incorporated in 1889) but worked as a part of the Cork and Muskerry Light Railway.

Final years
The line was comparatively unaffected by World War I, but experienced serious damage during the Irish Civil War of 1922–23. The destruction of a bridge over the River Lee seriously undermined the railway's viability; the railway was repaired and incorporated into the Great Southern Railways in 1925.

Road competition started to seriously affect the railway in the 1920s. The railway closed on 29 December 1934.

In one notable incident, a train collided with a steamroller on an adjacent road on 6 September 1927. Fault was disputed and it was mischievously suggested by some that the two were having a race. A fictionalised version appeared in the Rev. W. Awdry's Railway Series book no. 17, "Gallant Old Engine".

Rolling stock

Locomotives

The original three locomotives nos. 1–3 City of Cork, Coachford and St. Annes were originally supplied in a  configuration in 1887 by Falcon Engine & Car Works and were converted to  later.  No. 4, the first to be call Blarney, was a small  from Kitson and Company which was scrapped in 1911.  Traffic needs dictated the ordering of two further locomotives, Nos. 5 and 6, 'Donoughmore and The Muskerry,  types from a Thomas Green & Company of Leeds & London.  On closure of the CMLR these passed to the Schull and Skibbereen Railway and Tralee and Dingle Light Railway respectively.  Two more  engines, Nos. 7 and 8, Peake and Dripsey were from Brush Electrical Engineering Company, Falcon's successor were ordered in the later 1890s and 1905 respectively and were broadly similar to earlier ones from the same manufacturer.  The CMLR's final locomotive, No. 9, also named Blarney, a Hunslet Engine Company , was ordered in 1911 but only delivered in 1919 due to the war, and then scrapped in 1927.

Carriages and wagons
The CMLR main fleet consisted of just over twenty bogie passengers vehicles of   length seating of the order of 36 to 40 persons in a mixture of first and third classes.

See also
Cork, Blackrock and Passage Railway
Cork City Railways
List of narrow gauge railways in Ireland

References

Notes

Sources

 
 

Railway lines opened in 1887
Railway lines closed in 1934
Closed railways in Ireland
Transport in County Cork
3 ft gauge railways in Ireland